The Eras Tour is the ongoing sixth headlining concert tour by American singer-songwriter Taylor Swift. Having not toured for her studio albums Lover (2019), Folklore (2020), and Evermore (2020) due to the COVID-19 pandemic, Swift is embarking on the Eras Tour in support of all of her albums, including her latest, Midnights (2022). It is her second all-stadium tour, after the 2018 Reputation Stadium Tour. The U.S. leg commenced on March 17, 2023, in Glendale, Arizona, and is set to end on August 9, 2023, in Inglewood, California.

Described by Swift as a "journey through all of [her] musical eras", a concert of the Eras Tour is divided into 10 acts, each portraying one of Swift's studio albums conceptually. The tour received unanimous critical acclaim, with emphasis on the concept, production, and fashion; reviews also praised Swift's vocals, charisma, musicianship, and her stamina and versatility as an entertainer.

Media outlets described demand for tickets to the Eras Tour as "unprecedented" and "astronomical", with 3.5 million people registering for Ticketmaster's presale program for the U.S. leg. The company's website crashed on November 15 immediately after the presale commenced, but 2.4 million tickets to the tour were sold that day, breaking the all-time record for the most concert tickets sold by an artist in a single day. Nevertheless, Ticketmaster was met with widespread criticism and political scrutiny for the debacle in addition to allegations of monopoly within the concert business.

Background and development 

In support of her sixth studio album, Reputation (2017), Taylor Swift embarked on the Reputation Stadium Tour, her fifth concert tour, in 2018. It broke the record for the highest grossing U.S. tour in history. Due to the outbreak of the COVID-19 pandemic in early 2020, Swift cancelled her scheduled sixth concert tour, then titled Lover Fest, which was planned to support her seventh studio album, Lover (2019), with performances in stadiums as well as open-air venues and European festivals. Without touring since 2018, she released three studio albums—Folklore (2020), Evermore (2020), and Midnights (2022). She also released the re-recorded albums Fearless (Taylor's Version) and Red (Taylor's Version) in 2021.

In the days leading up to the release of Midnights, on October 18, 2022, Swift's United Kingdom website indirectly confirmed a forthcoming concert tour. Pre-ordering Midnights on the UK store resulted in "special presale code access for forthcoming and yet-to-be-announced Taylor Swift UK show dates." On The Tonight Show Starring Jimmy Fallon on October 24, Swift stated that she "should [go on tour]" and that "when it's time, [I will] do it". She confirmed that a tour would happen "soonish" at The Graham Norton Show on October 28.

On November 1, 2022, Swift announced on Good Morning America and through her social media accounts that her revamped sixth concert tour would be called the Eras Tour. She described it as "a journey through the musical eras of [her] career". It marks her first concert tour in five years. Its U.S. leg, which initially consisted of 27 dates across 20 cities, started on March 17, 2023, in Glendale, Arizona, and will conclude on August 9, 2023, in Inglewood, California. The opening acts for the U.S. leg of the tour are Paramore, Haim, Phoebe Bridgers, Beabadoobee, Girl in Red, Muna, Gayle, Gracie Abrams and Owenn, each two of whom share a date. Messina Touring Group, an AEG partner, is the tour's promoter.

Following popular demand, on November 4, eight extra U.S. dates were added to existing cities, bringing the total number of concerts to 35. High demand prompted 17 more shows to be added the following week, making the Eras Tour the biggest U.S. tour of Swift's career, with 52 dates, surpassing her preceding Reputation Stadium Tour (38 dates); all cities part of the Eras Tour enjoy two or more shows following the additions. International dates are to be announced later. Billboard described the tour's announcement as "the most chaos-inducing tour announcement of the decade."

In December 2022, Financial Times and Rolling Stone reported that the cryptocurrency exchange company FTX was previously in negotiations with Swift, offering her a US$100 million sponsorship deal, including a partnership for the Eras Tour and offering tickets as non-fungible tokens (NFTs), and that Swift denied the deal subsequently. FTX became defunct in November 2022, filing for bankruptcy.

On January 20, 2023, Argentine daily newspaper El Día claimed that Swift will tour Argentina for the first time, with two shows booked at La Plata's Estadio Único Diego Armando Maradona on October 6 and 8. They also claimed that Swift will tour Brazil as well. On January 23, 2023, Brazilian journalist José Norberto Flesch reported via Universo Online that Swift will tour Brazil between late September and October 2023, marking her return to the country after her first and only show back in 2012—an exclusive concert for one thousand fans.

On January 31, tour merchandise inspired by all of Swift's ten album "eras" were made available for purchase on her webstore.

Ticketing 
Tickets were previously set to go on sale to the general public on November 18, 2022. As a result of Swift's multi-year partnership with Capital One, cardholders had presale access, which was set to begin in the afternoon of November 15. Fans could register for the Ticketmaster Verified Fan program from November 1 through November 9 to receive a code that granted exclusive access to the TaylorSwiftTix Presale to purchase tickets in the morning of November 15; previous Lover Fest ticket holders also received preferred access to the presale if they registered using the same Ticketmaster account. Swift confirmed ticket prices in advance, abandoning the "platinum ticket" model; they ranged from $49 to $449, while VIP packages ranged from $199 to $899. USA Today reported that the listing for the Nashville tour dates included the disclaimer that "ticket prices may fluctuate, based on demand, at any time."

According to Ticketmaster, the TaylorSwiftTix Presale provided "the best opportunity to get more tickets into the hands of fans who want to attend the show" by evading bots and scalpers. The ticketing platform noted that if demand from the fan program "exceeds supply", it is possible that "verified fans may be selected at random to participate in the presale."

Ticketmaster controversy 

The tour recorded an incredibly high demand for tickets. On November 15, Ticketmaster's website crashed following "historically unprecedented demand with millions showing up", halting the presale. Ticketmaster immediately published a statement saying they are working to fix the issues "as the site was unprepared to accommodate the sheer force of hundreds of thousands of Swift fans", and subsequently reported that "hundreds of thousands of tickets" had already been sold and postponed the remainder of the presale. The public on-sale was later cancelled due to "extraordinarily high demands on ticketing systems and insufficient remaining ticket inventory to meet that demand". Ticketmaster was widely criticized by fans and customers online for a flawed ticketing model. CNN Business stated that the "astronomical" demand indicated Swift's popularity. However, Fortune and Bloomberg News attributed the criticism to Ticketmaster's "oft-confusing multistep buying process plagued with additional fees", as well as "long waits, technical problems, and poor customer service".

Greg Maffei, chairman of Live Nation, claimed that Ticketmaster prepared for 1.5 million verified fans but 14 million showed up: "we could have filled 900 stadiums." The company confirmed on November 17 that the November 18 public on-sale was cancelled as well, citing inability to meet demand. Swift released a statement on November 18, 2022, via her Instagram story; she stated that she is "pissed off" and found the fiasco "excruciating". She asserted that she was "not going to make excuses for anyone because we asked [Ticketmaster], multiple times, if they could handle this kind of demand and we were assured they could." Later that same day, Ticketmaster issued an apology "to Taylor and all of her fans" via their Twitter account. Various U.S. lawmakers, including attorneys general and members of the U.S. Congress, took notice of the issue, which became a subject of multiple congressional inquiries. The New York Times reported that the U.S. Department of Justice had opened an antitrust investigation into Live Nation Entertainment and Ticketmaster. A group of 26 fans sued Ticketmaster on December 2 for "intentional deception", "fraud, price fixing and antitrust violations".

Various journalists highlighted Swift's influence, and how the controversy could bode well for the music industry. Arwa Mahdawi wrote in The Guardian, "Swift has had an incredibly impressive career. But you know what? If she gets people to sit up and pay attention to the disgraceful state of antitrust laws in the U.S., I reckon that will be her finest achievement." Brooke Schultz of Associated Press discussed how Swift's fans magnified a website crash into a political movement and considered them an influential voter demographic during elections: "the sheer power and size of Swift’s fandom has spurred conversations about economic inequality, merely symbolized by Ticketmaster". Bloomberg journalist Augusta Saraiva termed the phenomenon "Swiftonomics"—a microeconomic theory that explains Swift's supply, demand, fanbase and political impact following the COVID-19 pandemic. I-D dubbed Swift the last remaining "real" popstar for "[s]hifting more albums and filling more stadiums than her contemporaries" and "creat[ing] a hysteria unseen since the industry's golden era." Pitchfork asked, "Is there any other artist who could force urgency into the federal investigation of a music industry monopoly just by going on tour?"

Ticketstoday sale 
On December 12, 2022, Ticketmaster began mailing select fans—"identified as [fans] who received a boost during the Verified Fan presale but did not purchase tickets"—and notified them of a second ticket-buying opportunity to purchase a maximum of two tickets per user, through the platform Ticketstoday. Billboard reported that Ticketmaster opted to sell the remaining 170,000 tickets over four weeks through Ticketstoday, a ticketing platform originally built for Dave Mathews Band's fanclub in the 2000s but was purchased by Live Nation in 2008, to "significantly reduce fan wait times".

Production

Staging and lighting 
The Eras Tour staging is expansive, consisting of three separate stages—the main stage with a giant, curved LED screen; the rhombic middle stage; and a T-shaped rectangular stage at the middle of the floor—all of which are connected by a broad ramp.  The stages together form a "hyperactive" hydraulic platform, with the main and middle stages equipped with mobile blocks that rise from the center to form platforms of different shapes. The tour's "massive" production is heavily inspired by Broadway, featuring pyrotechnics, indoor fireworks, PixMob LED bracelets, (which Swift had also provided to the audience on previous tours), and image projection technology. The tour's concept centers on worldbuilding and thus employs a diverse set of stage set-ups, props, and performing styles to convey the varying moods and aesthetics of Swift's albums.

Costume design 
The costumes worn by Swift and her accompanying dancers, as well as her microphones and guitars, on the Eras Tour paid homage to her 10 album "eras". They were inspired by previous performances and music videos, intended to align with the overarching themes and palette of the era Swift referenced in order to showcase the various sonic and visual aesthetics she had adopted throughout her career. Attire and accessories were mostly custom designs from fashion houses such as Versace, Roberto Cavalli, Oscar de la Renta, Christian Louboutin, Etro, Nicole + Felicia Couture, Zuhair Murad, and Alberta Ferretti. Swift wore variations of some costumes for different shows. Fautso Puglisi, a designer for Roberto Cavalli, stated that he took an "artisanal approach to craftsmanship" while customizing outfits for Swift, focusing on the fact that "everything must be eye-catching" when designing for concerts.

Concert synopsis 

The show is approximately three hours and 15 minutes long, the longest of Swift's career, and heavily features elements of theater. It consists of 44 songs that are divided into 10 acts. Each act is characterized by a specific color scheme, while transitions between acts are facilitated by on-screen interlude visuals and marked by costume changes with negligible intermissions. A concert of the Eras Tour encompasses the following acts:

 Lover: A clock on-screen counts down to show time. Surrounded by pastel-colored, fan-like parachutes, Swift emerges from the platform in the mid-stage in a glimmering bodysuit and knee-high boots. She opens the concert with "Miss Americana & the Heartbreak Prince", leading into "Cruel Summer". Swift then delivers the welcome note. Accompanied by dancers, she performs "The Man" and "You Need to Calm Down" in a sequined blazer, through a set emulating an office space, and sings "Lover" on a guitar, followed by a stripped-down rendition of "The Archer" alone on the ramp.
 Fearless: As gold sparks rained down, the stage pivots to an aesthetic representing Fearless. Swift reappears in a gold fringed dress and country boots characteristic of her early style. She performs "Fearless", "You Belong With Me" and "Love Story" alongside her band.
 Evermore: The stage adopts a forest aesthetic. Swift begins singing "'Tis the Damn Season" in a "burnt orange autumnal gown", followed by a dark theme that leads to "Willow" in a "witchy" séance; Swift wears an emerald cape while dancers perform with luminescent orange orbs. She continues with "Marjorie", then "Champagne Problems" on a moss-covered piano, concluding the act with "Tolerate It" on a dinner table setup.
 Reputation: The act begins with visuals of snakes. Swift reemerges in an "asymmetrical serpentine catsuit" reminiscent of her Reputation Stadium Tour costumes, and her dancers wear black leotards. She delivers a high-energy performance of "…Ready For It?" with gothic dancers, and "Delicate" surrounded by beams of light, leading into a fierce performance of "Don't Blame Me" elevated by harmonies. Swift leaps skyward on a platform during the song's climax. The act ends with "Look What You Made Me Do", which incorporates visuals of Swift from all the eras trapped in glass boxes on the screen.
 Speak Now: The screen depicts an abstract mosaic of purple lights. Swift, in a ball gown, performs "Enchanted", accompanied by acoustic strums and a full-band crescendo.
 Red: The stage turns red, and Swift begins with "22", wearing a modified version of the hippie-inspired T-shirt from the song's official music video. She then performs "We Are Never Ever Getting Back Together" and a condensed version of "I Knew You Were Trouble" with dancers dressed in red, and sings "All Too Well (10 Minute Version)" on an acoustic guitar alone. The act concludes with artificial snow falling.
 Folklore: The act is introduced with a lyrical recitation of "Seven". Onstage is the cottagecore cabin setup similar to the one from Swift's performance at the 63rd Annual Grammy Awards (2021), except it's on an elevated platform and has a staircase that expands when the platform elevates. Wearing a frilly gown, Swift performs "Invisible String" on the cabin's roof, "Betty" with her band, and "The Last Great American Dynasty" with dancers dressed in period clothes. She then starts singing "August", which transitions to a rock-tinged "Illicit Affairs", followed by "My Tears Ricochet" on the secondary stages with a choreography resembling a funeral procession. Swift returns to the cabin to perform "Cardigan". The act ends with fireflies on the screen.
 1989: "Style" kicks off the act, with Swift wearing a beaded crop top and skirt that calls back to her styling in 2014 and 2015. Moving to mid-stage, the dancers ride neon-lit bicycles for "Blank Space", and use blue-lit golf clubs to smash an animated car, a reference to the song's official music video and the choreography from the 1989 World Tour. It is followed by "Shake It Off" performed as a robust dance party; "Wildest Dreams" backed with clips of a couple in bed; and "Bad Blood" accentuated by intense pyrotechnics.
 Surprise songs: Swift performs one surprise song on an acoustic guitar and another on a piano on the T-stage, dressed in a frock. The audience bracelets light up in blue. Swift, in a "particularly remarkable" optical illusion, then dives into the stage floor and swims underwater through the ramp, across the stadium, to the main stage.
 Midnights:  A wave from the illusion hits the screen, which shows Swift climbing up a ladder into a cloud. The lower screen splits, and dancers carry out clouds as Swift reemerges in a purple fur coat to sing "Lavender Haze". She removes the coat and performs "Anti-Hero" with a video of herself as a "Godzilla-esque creature terrorizing a city" on the screen. The dancers equip themselves with umbrellas as Swift sings "Midnight Rain" and undergoes an onstage costume change, reappearing in a rhinestone-adorned, midnight blue bodysuit. She then performs a choreographed "chair dance" for "Vigilante Shit", influenced by "sultry" burlesque and the 1975 musical Chicago. It is followed by "Bejeweled" and "Mastermind" performances featuring the entire dance crew. The choreography for "Bejeweled" pays tribute to its viral TikTok dance moves. Swift wears a fringed jacket for "Karma", the finale, which ends in fireworks, colorful visuals, and confetti.

Critical reception 
The tour received rave reviews from music and entertainment critics. Neil McCormick of The Daily Telegraph, Keiran Southern of The Times, Adrian Horton of The Guardian, Kelsey Barnes of The Independent, and Ilana Kaplan of i gave the Eras Tour full five-star ratings. McCormick called the show "one of the most ambitious, spectacular and charming stadium pop shows ever seen", lauding Swift's musicianship, vocals and energy. Southern declared the Eras Tour "a pop genius at the top of her game". Horton praised the "rapturous" music selection, concept, the "extravagant" staging, and Swift's stamina and vocals. Barnes noted the tour as "a career defining spectacle" with acts marking the shifts in Swift's artistry, while Kaplan commended the "unparalleled" showmanship, "spicier" choreography, camp styles, and "seamless" transitions between acts.

The versatility in the music, performance, and visuals of the show was often a subject of praise in the reviews. Journalists Rebecca Lewis and Carson Mlnarik, of Hello! and MTV respectively, praised Swift's stage presence and commitment to her artistry; Lewis described Swift's alter ego during the tour as "country ingenue to pop princess and folklore witch", whereas Mlnarik affirmed that the screen visuals stayed true to every album's aesthetic. Jason Lipshutz, writing for Billboard, underscored Swift's "powerhouse" vocals, engaging artistic personas, and skill set. Jon Caramanica of The New York Times highlighted the tour's scale, ambition, and portrayal of all the musical pivots of Swift's career. The Atlantic critic Spencer Kornhaber complimented the show's art direction, suspense, and the sequencing of the acts. Mikael Wood of Los Angeles Times described the show as a "masterclass in pop ambition", showcasing Swift's range.

Critics also appreciated the tour's production value. Philip Cosores of Uproxx dubbed it the "most impressive stadium show ever conceived", atypical of pop and rock artists. USA Today Melissa Ruggieri noted that no mainstream artist since Bruce Springsteen has "packed so much music into one show." Pollstar Christina Fuoco and Rolling Stone Waiss David Aramesh agreed that the tour is "live music at its highest spectacle" and "a production spectacle of the highest echelon", commending Swift's showmanship. Spin critic Jonathan Cohen admired the tour for its rich stage design, usage of "state-of-the-art" technology, and offering an immersive experience into Swift's "increasingly accomplished musical world-building". He added that artists at their prime very rarely present their discography like Swift did. Chris Willman, writing in Variety, felt that the "epic" show sums up why the 21st-century's greatest pop songwriter is also its most popular performer.

Commercial performance

Projections 
However, Variety noted that "setting a record gross for international touring may be tougher" as English singer-songwriter Ed Sheeran holds the record with his ÷ Tour (2017–19), which consisted of 255 dates. Swift's five-show run at SoFi Stadium in Los Angeles also stands to generate the highest boxscore at a single venue in the U.S. She could break the SoFi Stadium record set by South Korean boy group BTS' four shows in 2022, which grossed $33.3 million, and the all-time U.S. record held by Bruce Springsteen's 10-night stand at Giants Stadium in 2003, which grossed $38.7 million. Following the Ticketmaster controversy, Pollstar projected Swift to gross an increased $728 million sum across her 52 U.S. dates and "a mind-boggling billion dollars" internationally, surpassing Sheeran's all-time record with less than half of his tour's dates; it would become the first tour in history to gross a billion-dollar sum.

Records 

 In the first day of its pre-sale alone, the Eras Tour sold over 2.4 million tickets, the most sold by an artist in a single day. The record was previously held by Robbie Williams, who sold 1.6 million tickets for his Close Encounters Tour in 2005.
 Billboard reported on December 15 that the Eras Tour had already grossed an estimated $554 million, and projected the U.S. leg to finish with $591 million, surpassing the former all-time female record set by Madonna's Sticky & Sweet Tour ($407 million) in 2008–2009.

Impact 

On March 9, 2023, media outlets reported that the city administration of Glendale had decided to temporarily change the city's name in honor of the city hosting the first concert of the Eras Tour. Mayor Jerry Weiers announced the "symbolic" name on March 13. The Westgate Entertainment District, a mixed-use complex in Glendale, put up welcoming messages, and local restaurants offered Swift-themed menu items. The temporary name was "Swift City" from March 17 to 18, 2023.

Swift released four songs on the day of the opening show to celebrate the tour's launch: "Eyes Open (Taylor's Version)" and "Safe & Sound (Taylor's Version)", originally from the 2012 soundtrack The Hunger Games: Songs from District 12 and Beyond; "If This Was a Movie (Taylor's Version)", a re-recording of the deluxe track from Speak Now (2010); and "All of the Girls You Loved Before", a previously unreleased song from Lover that had leaked online.

Set list 
This is the setlist from the tour's first concert (March 17, 2023, in Glendale), and is not intended to represent all shows of the tour.

Act I: Lover
 "Miss Americana & the Heartbreak Prince"
 "Cruel Summer"
 "The Man"
 "You Need to Calm Down"
 "Lover"
 "The Archer"

Act II: Fearless
   "Fearless"
 "You Belong with Me"
 "Love Story"

Act III: Evermore
  "'Tis the Damn Season"
 "Willow"
 "Marjorie"
 "Champagne Problems"
 "Tolerate It"

Act IV: Reputation
  "...Ready for It?"
 "Delicate"
 "Don't Blame Me"
 "Look What You Made Me Do"

Act V: Speak Now
 "Enchanted"

Act VI: Red
 "22"
 "We Are Never Ever Getting Back Together"
 "I Knew You Were Trouble"
 "All Too Well (10 Minute Version)"

Act VII: Folklore
  "Seven"  / "Invisible String"
 "Betty"
 "The Last Great American Dynasty"
 "August"
 "Illicit Affairs"
 "My Tears Ricochet"
 "Cardigan"

Act VIII: 1989
 "Style"
 "Blank Space"
 "Shake It Off"
 "Wildest Dreams"
 "Bad Blood"

'''Act IX: Surprise songs
 Acoustic guitar surprise song
 Piano surprise song

Act X: Midnights
 "Lavender Haze"
 "Anti-Hero"
 "Midnight Rain"
 "Vigilante Shit"
 "Bejeweled"
 "Mastermind"
 "Karma"

Surprise songs 
Swift performed some tracks as "surprise songs" on an acoustic guitar and a piano after "Bad Blood", with different song choices at each concert.

Shows

See also
 City of Lover – a 2019 one-day concert by Swift in Paris
 Folklore: The Long Pond Studio Sessions – a 2020 concert documentary film by Swift

Footnotes

References

External links
 The Eras Tour official website

2023 concert tours
Taylor Swift concert tours
Concert tours of North America
Concert tours of the United States